Henry of Pisa is a cardinal from the 12th century. He urged Thomas Becket to accept the role of archbishop after Archbishop Theobald of Bec died. He was the pope’s legate.

References 

Year of death missing
Year of birth missing
12th-century cardinals